Japanese Language and Literature is a biannual peer-reviewed academic journal published by The Association of Teachers of Japanese. It was established in 1966 as the Journal of the Association of Teachers of Japanese, obtaining its current title in 2001. The journal covers the pedagogy of Japanese language teaching, Japanese linguistics, and Japanese literature. It also carries reviews of books germane to its main areas of interest, including textbooks, grammars, and vocabulary guides, and extensive, annotated, bibliographical coverage of both Ph.D. and, more recently, M.A. theses. The editor-in-chief is Hiroshi Nara (University of Pittsburgh).

External links
 
Journal at The Association of Teachers of Japanese

Japanese studies journals
Literary magazines published in the United States
Language education journals
Publications established in 1963
Biannual journals
English-language journals